Yarrangobilly, New South Wales is a rural locality in the Snowy Mountains, west of Canberra, Australia, and is also a civil Parish of Buccleuch County.

Yarrangobilly is on the Snowy Mountains Highway, south east of Tumut, New South Wales, and west of Canberra, Australia. The parish in the Kosciuszko National Park.

Yarrangobilly is in the Snowy Valleys Council Area.

Climate

Yarrangobilly yields a similar climate to that of Kiandra, albeit of greater continentality due to its more inland position; diurnal range is especially impressive. Snowfall is frequent, and oftentimes, heavy.

References

Localities in New South Wales
Snowy Valleys Council
Parishes of Buccleuch County